Xavier Antonio Quevedo Chinchilla (born 21 January 1991) is a Venezuelan racing cyclist. He rode at the 2014 UCI Road World Championships.

Major results

2011
 1st Stage 3 Vuelta a Venezuela
2012
 1st  Road race, National Road Championships
 1st Stage 4 Vuelta a Venezuela
2014
 1st  Road race, National Road Championships
 1st  Points classification Vuelta a Venezuela
 6th Road race, Central American and Caribbean Games
2015
 Vuelta a Venezuela
1st  Points classification
1st Stage 8
 9th Copa Federación Venezolana de Ciclismo
2016
 Vuelta a Venezuela
1st Stages 9 & 10
 10th Overall Tour du Maroc
2017
 Vuelta a Venezuela
1st  Points classification
1st Stages 2 & 10
 6th Road race, Pan American Road Championships
2019
 Vuelta a Venezuela
1st Stages 1 & 7
 1st Stage 5 Vuelta a Miranda
2021
 1st Stage 5 Vuelta a Venezuela
2022 
 Vuelta al Táchira
1st  Points classification 
1st Stage 3
 2nd Road race, National Road Championships

References

External links
 

1991 births
Living people
Venezuelan male cyclists
People from Zulia
Cyclists at the 2015 Pan American Games
Pan American Games competitors for Venezuela
20th-century Venezuelan people
21st-century Venezuelan people